Police is a small village in the Municipality of Cerkno in the traditional Littoral region of Slovenia.

The local church is dedicated to the Nativity of Mary and belongs to the Parish of Šentviška Gora.

References

External links
Police on Geopedia

Populated places in the Municipality of Cerkno